SEW-EURODRIVE GmbH & Co KG is a German manufacturing company headquartered in Bruchsal, Germany.

The company produces gear units, motors, electric motor and inverter technology.

The beginnings under Ernst Blickle
Started with the designer Albert Obermoser. His geared motor, designed in 1928, revolutionized drive technology. Christian Pähr, a trained banker, recognized the enormous potential of that drive design and acquired the rights to the geared motor from the bankrupt estate of Obermoser AG. Despite economic and political turmoil, he founded the company "Süddeutsche-Elektromotoren-Werke" in 1931, known since 1971 as SEW-EURODRIVE. Just a few years later in 1935, when Christian Pähr died, his wife Kunigunde Pähr took over the company with the support of their daughter Edeltraut Pähr. In 1945, Ernst Wilhelm Blickle, Christian Pähr’s son-in-law, took over as managing director of the company.

Until 1945, when the Allied Strategic Command bombed Bruchsal into rubble, SEW produced motors. After Germany's surrender the company became an entity of the US—via the Marshall Plan. When this was concluded in 1948, the company was returned to its owners, the Blickles. Due to increasing production demands following the economic growth after the war, Ernst Blickle laid the cornerstone for a 10,000 square meter manufacturing facility in Graben, ten kilometers away. In the wake of a plant expansion at a later time, Ernst Blickle also had social rooms constructed for his employees and training workshops.

In 1965, SEW-EURODRIVE presented its innovative modular system for gearmotors. The customized production is organized centrally in a small number of plants with high volumes while assembly is performed as close as possible to the customer. This ensures a greater degree of customization with short delivery times.
After the death of Ernst Blickle in 1987, his sons Rainer and Jürgen Blickle took over as managing partners of SEW-EURODRIVE.

International expansion
In 1960, SEW-EURODRIVE opened its first foreign subsidiary – SEW-USOCOME – in Haguenau, Alsace. Between 1968 and 1969, the company began expanding by opening assembly plants in Sweden, Italy and England.

In 1974, the first employees started their work at SEW-EURODRIVE in Canada, which was the beginning of the American expansion of the company. In 1975 and 1978, the company continued on its course of international expansion by opening production and assembly plants in the US and Brazil.

In the 1980s, new sites in the metropolises Melbourne (Australia) and Johannesburg (South Africa) were established. Assembly plants in Japan and Singapore marked the beginning of the Asian expansion.

SEW-EURODRIVE has already had its presence in Russia since 1993.
With production and assembly sites constructed in 1994, the Asian expansion continued and SEW-EURODRIVE established itself on the Asian market. Following this expansion, a new branch opened in India in 1997.

Key figures
More than 19,000 employees at over 430 sites worldwide generate sales of over 3 billion euros. SEW-EURODRIVE has 17 production and 85 assembly plants around the world called Drive Technology Centers. 23% of the employees are engineers and computer scientists.

Product portfolio 
 Gearmotors, gear units and motors
 Electronically controlled drives (frequency inverters)
 Components for decentralized Installation
 Servo technology
 Large and industrial gear units
 Mechanical variable-speed drives
 Explosion-proof drives according to ATEX, IECEx or HazLoc-NA®
 Control technology
 Services

Research project efeuCampus 
SEW is partner of the future project for urban and autonomous freight logistics, efeuCampus in Bruchsal, which is funded by the European Union and the state Baden-Württemberg. SEW is responsible for research and development of the autonomous delivery vehicles and the technical infrastructure. SEW is responsible for induction charging systems, for the electrified vehicles, the development of a 5G infrastructure for communication, and the delivery of parcels and recyclables to and from the test area residents. The aim of the project is to transfer innovative solutions from the modern factory to the urban logistics.

Foundations

SEW-Eurodrive-Foundation 
In November 1989, Edeltraut Blickle established the SEW-EURODRIVE Foundation in memory of her husband Ernst Wilhelm Blickle. Ever since, the foundation has promoted scientific work and the further development of scientific knowledge in the areas of technology (basic and applied research) and business (management, corporate governance and policy).

Prizes 
The Ernst Blickle Prize, worth 100,000 euros, has been awarded by the SEW-EURODRIVE Foundation since 1991. Today, it is presented every two years. Prize winners are selected by the Board of Trustees and a specially appointed committee according to the foundation charter. Previous prize winners:

 1991 Manfred Depenbrock, Bochum (Germany)
 1992 Hans Winter (†), München (Germany)
 1993 Wolfgang Finke, Wachtberg-Ließem (Germany)
 1994 Darle W. Dudley (†), San Diego (United States)
 1995 Ferenc Anistis, Haidershofen (Austria)
 1996 Manfred Rose, Heidelberg (Germany)
 1997 Manfred Weck, Aachen (Germany)
 1998 Jörg Hugel Zürich (Switzerland)
 1999 Georges Henriot, Gif-sur Yvette (France)
 2000 Richard van Basshuysen, Bad Wimpfen (Germany)
 2002 Joachim Milberg, München (Germany)
 2004 Fred C. Lee, (United States)
 2006 Bernd-Robert Höhn, München (Germany)
 2008 Gerd Hirzinger, Oberpfaffenhofen (Germany)
 2010 Michael Rogowski, Stuttgart (Germany)
 2012 Martin Kannegiesser, Posen (Poland)
 2014 Leo Lorenz
 2016 Martin A. Kapp

Edeltraudt-Blickle-Stiftung 
In September 1992, Rainer Blickle established the Edeltraut Blickle Foundation. The foundation pursues charitable purposes only. The foundation supports medical research establishments, hospitals and other institutes in the area of health care and people in need of social and medical care.

References

Manufacturing companies of Germany
Manufacturing companies established in 1931
German brands